is a Japanese media company that publishes manga, anime, video games and trading card games. It operates a chain of retailers in Japan called Gamers which carries similar products and accessories. Broccoli is best known for their , Galaxy Angel and Aquarian Age franchises.

History
Satsuki Yamashita, the editor of Broccoli Books, explained that the company derived its president's desire to create a memorable name similar to that of Apple Inc. While trying to imagine of another fruit or vegetable, he arrived at broccoli. This coincidentally has the same name in nearly every language.

On January 23, 2008, Broccoli announced it would be collaborating with leading industry retailer Animate to form a new company called "AniBro". Broccoli holds a minority 30% ownership of the company, which is managed by the CEO of Animate.

Subsidiaries

Gamers
Broccoli owns a chain of retail stores, Gamers, which distributes anime, manga, audio dramas, anime music CDs, figurines, snacks, stationery, apparel, posters, calendars, trading cards and accessories such as cell phone straps and keychains. Headquartered at the Akihabara location in Tokyo, the store has locations throughout Japan. The first Gamers opened in Ikebukuro, a district of Tokyo, Japan in July 1996, and which closed its doors on January 15, 2006.  Broccoli opened a store in Los Angeles, California, Anime Gamers USA, that also acted as the main distributor of Broccoli Book's releases in the United States. On November 20, 2008, Broccoli announced that they would be withdrawing from the US market and closed down shop, shortly afterward.

Broccoli Books
Broccoli Books was a subsidiary that published manga in North America. It had a boys love imprint, Boysenberry Books, that launched in 2007. It ceased operations in December 2008 and all the titles reverted to the Japanese holders.

Synch-Point
The Synch-Point division produced English-language versions of anime and manga for North American distribution. Originally started as the anime division for Digital Manga in 2001, they were split off and acquired by Broccoli in 2002. They went on a hiatus in March 2005, before shutting down in 2008. The company was known for incomplete English dubs, with the exception of "FLCL" which has since been subsequently re-licensed to Funimation, while the second and third seasons were licensed by Warner Bros.

References

External links
  
 
 

GungHo Online Entertainment
Mass media companies of Japan
Video game companies of Japan
Anime companies
Video game companies established in 1994
Mass media companies established in 1994
Mass media in Tokyo
Japanese companies established in 1994